Plaza Interiör is a monthly design magazine published in Sweden.

History and profile
Plaza Interiör was established in 1995. The magazine is part of the Plaza Publishing Group, and is published by Plaza Publishing Group AB on a monthly basis. It features articles on interior design and home decoration. The magazine is based in Solna, Stockholm.

See also
List of magazines in Sweden

References

External links
 Official website

1995 establishments in Sweden
Design magazines
Magazines established in 1995
Magazines published in Stockholm
Swedish-language magazines
Monthly magazines published in Sweden